Numerous notable people have had some form of mood disorder. This is a list of people accompanied by verifiable sources associating them with some form of bipolar disorder (formerly known as "manic depression"), including cyclothymia, based on their own public statements; this discussion is sometimes tied to the larger topic of creativity and mental illness. In the case of dead people only, individuals with a speculative or retrospective diagnosis should only be listed if they are accompanied by a source reflective of the mainstream, academic view. Individuals should not be added to this list unless the disorder is regularly and commonly mentioned in mainstream, reliable sources.



A 
 Alvin Ailey, American choreographer, diagnosed with bipolar disorder (then called manic depression).
 Sherman Alexie, Native American poet, writer, and filmmaker.
 Lily Allen, English musician.
 Louis Althusser, French Marxist philosopher.
 August Ames, Canadian pornographic actress.
Desmond Daniel Amofah, American YouTuber, Streamer, and model.
 Michael Angelakos, American musician, frontman of Passion Pit.
 Adam Ant, English musician and actor.
 Emilie Autumn, American singer and violinist.
 John Adams,  was an American statesman, attorney, diplomat, writer, and Founding Father who served as the second president of the United States from 1797 to 1801

B 
 Tyler Baltierra, American reality television personality.
 Maria Bamford, American comedian, stated in an interview with The Salt Lake Tribune that she has been diagnosed with bipolar II disorder.
 Marcel Barbeau, Canadian artist and painter.
 Maria Bello, producer, actress and writer.
 Max Bemis, frontman of the band Say Anything, spoke about his diagnosis in an interview with Alternative Magazine in 2014.
 Maurice Benard, actor, discussed his diagnosis on The Oprah Winfrey Show, and has since become active in promoting bipolar awareness.
 Benga (Adegbenga Adejumo), British dubstep DJ and producer.
 A. C. Benson, English essayist, poet, author and the 28th Master of Magdalene College, Cambridge.
 Davone Bess, American football player.
 Devika Bhushan, Indian-American pediatrician and public health professional; served as California's Acting Surgeon General (2022)
 Jayson Blair, American journalist formerly with The New York Times.
 Paul Boyd, classical animator.
 Ronald Braunstein, American orchestra conductor and cofounder of the ME2/Orchestra for individuals like himself who have mental illness. 
 L. Brent Bozell Jr., American conservative activist and writer. He wrote publicly about his experiences with and recovery from bipolar disorder.
 Russell Brand, British comedian, actor, radio host, author, and activist.
 Jonathan Brandis, American actor.
 Jeremy Brett, English Shakespearian actor, known for his definitive portrayal of A. Conan Doyle's detective Sherlock Holmes in the 1984–1994 Granada TV Series, "Sherlock Holmes", diagnosed with manic depression. Days before his death in 1995, he recorded a frank and uplifting message for the Manic/Depressive Fellowship in London.
Chris Brown, American singer, songwriter, rapper, dancer, and actor, Brown has been diagnosed with Bipolar II disorder.
 Tiffany Lee Brown, American writer, artist, and musician, has created works that reference her Bipolar I diagnosis including the Noise music composition "Belly" appearing on Women Take Back the Noise.
 Barney Bubbles, English graphic artist whose work encompassed graphic design and music video direction. Bubbles took his own life when he was 41.
 Art Buchwald, humorist and Pulitzer Prize winner.
 Elbridge Ayer Burbank, artist and painter, Burbank was diagnosed with manic depression and was treated at several different facilities during his life.

C 
 Eoin Cameron, former member of the Australian House of Representatives and radio personality in Perth, Western Australia.
 Robert Campeau, Canadian financier and real estate developer.
 Cosmo Campoli, American sculptor and teacher.
 Mariah Carey, American singer-songwriter. Diagnosed with Bipolar II disorder in 2001.
 Aaron Carter, American singer.
 Quincy Carter, American football quarterback.
 Keisha Castle-Hughes, New Zealand actress.
 Dick Cavett, comedian and television journalist.
 Eason Chan, Hong Kongese popular music singer.
 Akio Chiba, Japanese manga artist, committed suicide due to issues related to bipolar disorder.
 Angus Crichton, Australian representative rugby league player
 Winston Churchill, British statesman, soldier, and writer who served as Prime Minister of the United Kingdom from 1940 to 1945
 Rosemary Clooney, American singer and actress.
 Kurt Cobain, American musician and frontman of Nirvana.
 Neil Cole, former Australian Labor party politician. "Associate Professor Cole was the first politician in Australia or overseas to admit to having a mental illness, namely bipolar mood disorder."
 Samuel Taylor Coleridge, English Romantic poet.
 Mary Ellen Copeland, PhD, author, educator and mental health advocate.
Francis Ford Coppola, American film director, producer, and screenwriter, was diagnosed by a psychiatrist as having bipolar disorder.
 Patricia Cornwell, American crime writer.
 Robert S. Corrington, American philosopher and professor of Philosophical Theology. In his book Riding the Windhorse: Manic-Depressive Disorder and the Quest for Wholeness, he gives a personal account of his own experience with the condition.
 Michael Costa, former Australian Labor party politician and Treasurer of NSW. "Mr Costa said a number of state parliamentary colleagues approached him about their mental health problems after he publicly revealed his battle with bipolar disorder in 2001."
 Sean Costello, American blues musician.
 Vincent Crane, keyboard player of Atomic Rooster.
 John Curtin, 14th Prime Minister of Australia (1941–1945).

D 
 Paul Dalio, American writer, director and composer. He made his feature directorial debut with Touched with Fire (2016), a film which drew upon his own experience with bipolar disorder.
 Penina Davidson, Former college basketball player at University of California-Berkeley. Current professional basketball player for the Melbourne Boomers of the Women's National Basketball League in Australia. She also represents New Zealand on their national team, the Tall Ferns. While in college, she was self-harming. Her teammate suggested that she get admitted to a hospital where she got diagnosed with bipolar disorder
 Ray Davies, English composer. Davies was diagnosed with bipolar disorder and he attempted suicide.
 Adam Deacon, English film actor, rapper, writer and director. Deacon discussed his diagnosis in a 2016 interview with Stephen Fry.
 Swadesh Deepak, Indian playwright, novelist and short-story writer.
 Disco D, record producer and composer.
 DMX, American rapper and actor.
 Gaetano Donizetti, Italian composer, Donizetti was exhibiting symptoms of syphilis and probable bipolar disorder.
 Mike Doughty, singer from alternative rock band Soul Coughing.
 Robert Downey Jr. American actor and film producer.
 Richard Dreyfuss, actor, appeared in a BBC documentary to talk about his experience with the disorder.
 Patty Duke, actress, author, and mental health advocate.
 Andy Dunn, co-founder and former CEO of Bonobos (apparel).

E 
 Thomas Eagleton, United States Senator from Missouri. He was privately diagnosed with bipolar type II in 1983, eleven years after stepping down as George McGovern's running mate during the latter's presidential campaign in 1972 due to the revelation of Eagleton receiving electroconvulsive therapy in the 1960s.
 Matt Edmondson, British Television and radio presenter, has cyclothymia.
 Paul M. English, Entrepreneur and Founder of Kayak (company).

F 
David Feherty, former professional golfer on the European Tour and PGA Tour.
 Carrie Fisher, actress and writer. Starred in the Star Wars films as Princess Leia.
 Zelda Fitzgerald, American socialite and novelist, and the wife of American author F. Scott Fitzgerald, diagnosed at the time as schizophrenia, but now thought likelier to be bipolar disorder.
 Caroline Flack, English actress and television and radio presenter.
 Helen Flanagan, English model, Actress.
 Tom Fletcher, English singer, songwriter, pianist, and guitarist, of McFly, discussed his bipolar disorder in the book Unsaid Things... Our Story.
 Larry Flynt, publisher and the president of Larry Flynt Publications (LFP) and Hustler Magazine.
 Ellen Forney, graphic artist and cartoonist and creator of Marbles: Madness, Depression, Michelangelo, and Me.
 FouseyTube, American YouTube personality.
 Connie Francis, singer.
 Jennifer Frey, journalist.
 Stephen Fry, actor, comedian, and writer. Fry was the center of the Emmy Award-winning documentary Stephen Fry: The Secret Life of the Manic Depressive in which he shares his experience being diagnosed with cyclothymic disorder and interviews a number of celebrities who are also diagnosed with bipolar-related disorders.
 Justin Furstenfeld, lead singer of Blue October.

G 
 The Game, Gangster Rapper.
 Alan Garner, novelist, wrote about having bipolar disorder in a collection of critical and autobiographical essays.
 Jeff Garlin, American actor
 Paul Gascoigne, English footballer, wrote about his treatment for bipolar disorder in his second book.
 Isa Genzken, German contemporary artist.
 Mel Gibson, actor and director.
 Selena Gomez, American singer-songwriter and actress. Revealed her bipolar diagnosis in April 2020 in an Instagram livestream with Miley Cyrus.
 Matthew Good, Canadian musician. He first disclosed his illness in a personal blog.
 Boon Gould, British musician.
 Glenn Gould, Canadian pianist.
 Philip Graham, publisher and businessman.
Graham Greene, English novelist.
Everson Griffen, American football player

H 
Charles Haley, American football linebacker.
 Terry Hall, lead singer of The Specials.
 Halsey, American singer and songwriter.
 Charles Hamilton, American hip hop recording artist.
 Linda Hamilton, actress, star of the Terminator movies. Was diagnosed at the age of 40.
Suzy Favor Hamilton, American former middle distance runner.
Jeff Hammerbacher, data scientist, chief scientist at Cloudera.
 David Harbour, American actor.
Anthony Hardy, English serial killer.
 Beth Hart, American singer and songwriter.
 Teddy Hart, Canadian professional wrestler.
 Mariette Hartley, American actress, has publicly spoken about her bipolar disorder, was a founder of the American Foundation for Suicide Prevention.
 Doug Harvey, Canadian professional ice hockey player.
 Jonathan Hay, Australian rules footballer.
Ernest Hemingway American journalist, won the Pulitzer Prize (1953) and the Nobel Prize in Literature (1954) for his novel The Old Man and the Sea. He was diagnosed with bipolar disorder and insomnia in his later years, He committed suicide in 1961.
 Drewe Henley, British actor, Henley and his illness were discussed in her autobiography White Cargo.
 Kristin Hersh, musician, of rock band Throwing Muses, has spoken about her bipolar disorder.
Derek Hess, designer and visual artist.
Shane Hmiel, NASCAR driver.
 Abbie Hoffman, political activist, anarchist.
 Marya Hornbacher, writer.
 Byron Houston, basketball player.
 Cat Hulbert, American card player.
 Meg Hutchinson, American folk singer-songwriter.
Julian Huxley, British evolutionary biologist, eugenicist, and internationalist. In his wife's autobiography it seems that he had the form of bipolar disorder.
Phyllis Hyman, American R&B singer-songwriter.

I
Greg Inglis, former Australian representative rugby league footballer and captain of South Sydney Rabbitohs. Diagnosed Bipolar II in 2019.

J 
 Jesse Jackson, Jr., former member of the United States House of Representatives, has stated he's been diagnosed with bipolar II disorder.
 Kay Redfield Jamison, American clinical psychologist, professor of psychiatry and writer, has written extensively about her personal experiences with bipolar disorder, including in An Unquiet Mind.
 Jang Keun Suk, South Korean actor and singer.
 Jill Janus, American heavy metal singer.
 Adam Jasinski, winner of the U.S. series Big Brother 9.
 Andrew Johns, Australian rugby league player. Publicly announced his condition following retirement.
 "Fast" Eddie Johnson, American basketball player, was diagnosed with manic depression.
 Linea Johnson, American author of the book Perfect Chaos and mental health advocate
 Daniel Johnston, musician, singer-songwriter and visual artist.
 Lucia Joyce, daughter of writer James Joyce, was diagnosed with cyclothymia.
 Sarah Joyce, British singer–songwriter.
 Helmi Juvonen, American artist and painter, hospitalized and diagnosed with manic-depression.

K 
 Frida Kahlo, Mexican painter
 Krizz Kaliko, American hip hop musician.
 Antonie Kamerling, Dutch actor.
 Chris Kanyon, American professional wrestler.
 Margarita Karapanou, Greek novelist.
 Kerry Katona, English television presenter, writer, magazine columnist, and former pop singer with girl band Atomic Kitten.
 Patrick J. Kennedy, former member of the United States House of Representatives, has spoken on his mental health issues, including diagnosed bipolar disorder.
Morio Kita, Japanese psychiatrist, novelist, and essayist.
 Margot Kidder, American actress.
 Otto Klemperer, German-born American conductor and composer, was diagnosed with cyclothymia.
 Cássia Kis, Brazilian actress.
John Konrads, Australian freestyle swimmer.

L 
David LaChapelle, American commercial photographer, fine-art photographer, music video director, film director, and artist.
Mary Lambert, American actress, singer, and writer, revealed that she had the illness in an interview with shewired.com and in her 2014 song "Secrets".
Debra LaFave, schoolteacher who had sexual relations with minor student.
Andrew Lange, astrophysicist and Goldberger Professor of Physics at the California Institute of Technology in Pasadena, California, he was awarded Balzan Prize and Dan David Prize. Had from mood disorder and committed suicide in a hotel in 2010.
René-Robert Cavelier, Sieur de La Salle, French explorer who explored the Great Lakes region and claimed the Mississippi River basin for France.
Yung Lean, Swedish rapper and singer.
AJ Lee, American professional wrestler and author.
Yoon Ha Lee, Korean-American science fiction writer.
 Lee Joon, South Korean singer and actor.
 Chyler Leigh, American actress
 Vivien Leigh, English actress, most famous for her role as Scarlett O'Hara in David O. Selznick's movie Gone with the Wind.
 Bernard Levin, English journalist, mentions it in his autobiography
 Jenifer Lewis, American actress, spoke about her diagnosis on Oprah in September 2007.
 Bill Lichtenstein, Peabody Award-winning print and broadcast journalist and documentary filmmaker, profiled in Time magazine, 10 October 1994.
 Thomas Ligotti, American horror author
 Abraham Lincoln, American lawyer and statesman who served as the 16th president of the United States from 1861
Arthur Lipsett, film director.
Bernard Loiseau, French chef, was the chef and the owner of 3-star Michelin restaurant-La Côte d'Or, Loiseau committed suicide on 24 February 2003.
 Ellen Joyce Loo, Hong Kong singer and songwriter.
 Demi Lovato, Singer and songwriter.
Ada Lovelace, British mathematician, often regarded as the first computer programmer.
Ris Low, beauty pageant titleholder, Miss Singapore World 2009.

M 
Gustav Mahler, composer.
Tina Malone, British television actress, writer, director, and producer (Brookside, Shameless). Diagnosed with obsessive compulsive disorder and bipolar disorder in 1998.
Jesse Zook Mann, American television producer.
Elizabeth Manley, Canadian former competitive figure skater.
 Johnny Manziel, American football player. In an interview in 2018, Manziel recounted his personal problems, and has stated that he had been diagnosed with bipolar disorder.
Jessica Marais, South African-Australian actress. She has stated that she has had bipolar episodes since she was 12 years old, suggesting that these episodes have been caused by the death of her father from a heart attack.
Emily Martin, sinologist, anthropologist, feminist, professor at New York University; drew on her own experience with bipolar disorder to write Bipolar Expeditions: Mania and Depression in American Culture.
Karen McCarthy, former member of the United States House of Representatives, was revealed to have been diagnosed with bipolar disorder in 2009.
Arthur McIntyre, Australian artist.
Lenny McLean, English unlicensed boxer, bouncer, bodyguard, businessman and actor.
Kristy McNichol, actress.
Burgess Meredith, actor, had cyclothymia.
Randy Meisner, American musician.
H. V. Meyerowitz, artist, educator and British colonial administrator in Africa, had cyclothymia.
Dimitri Mihalas, astrophysicist.
Liz Miller, British physician, surgeon, campaigner and writer.
Kate Millet, artist, activist and Feminist writer.
Eric Millegan, actor.
 Spike Milligan, comedian.
Valdemar Schønheyder Møller, Danish painter, known for his depictions of sunlight. He had bipolar episodes. In 1901, he was admitted to the psychiatric hospital in Aarhus and remained there until his death in 1905.
 Melody Moezzi, activist, lawyer, and author of Haldol and Hyacinths: A Bipolar Life.
 Seaneen Molloy, Northern Irish blogger.
 Ben Moody, guitarist, musician, formerly with Evanescence.
Jonathan Morrell, English radio and television producer, was diagnosed with cyclothymia.
Charles Mount, American artist.
 Allison Moyet, British singer
 Petr Muk, Czech singer.
 John A. Mulheren, American financier, stock and option trader, and philanthropist.
 Edvard Munch, Norwegian painter.
 Robert Munsch, author.
 Craig Murray, former British ambassador to Uzbekistan and political activist.

N 
Kim Novak, actress.
Jason Nash, YouTuber.
Isaac Newton, English Physicist, Inventor of Calculus.

O 
 Oxxxymiron, Russian hip-hop artist.
 Phil Ochs, singer-songwriter, political activist. Suicide at age 36.
 Bill Oddie, naturalist, comedian, and television presenter.
 Dolores O'Riordan, Irish musician and singer-songwriter, leader of the rock band The Cranberries.
 Craig Owens, singer for American bands Chiodos, and Destroy Rebuild Until God Shows.

P 
 Steven Page, former singer for rock band Barenaked Ladies.
 Nicola Pagett, actor. Wrote about her bipolar disorder in her autobiography Diamonds Behind My Eyes.
 Chris Palko, better known by his stage name Cage, was diagnosed with bipolar during his stay at Stony Lodge Hospital
 Jaco Pastorius, jazz musician. "Jaco was diagnosed with this clinical bipolar condition in the fall of 1982. The events which led up to it were considered "uncontrolled and reckless" incidents."
 Jane Pauley, TV presenter and journalist. The former Today and Dateline host describes being diagnosed with bipolar disorder in her 2004 autobiography Skywriting: A Life Out of the Blue, as well as on her short-lived talk show.
Ota Pavel, Czech writer, journalist and sport reporter.
Lynne Perrie, English actress (Coronation Street, Queenie's Castle, Kes), singer, comedienne, presenter and author. In an interview with the Daily Mirror newspaper, in 2000 she spoke about her manic depression, as well as memory loss and spending ten weeks in a psychiatric hospital.
Jimmy Piersall, American baseball player.
William Pitt, 1st Earl of Chatham, British statesman.
 Sylvia Plath, poet and writer, may have experienced bipolar disorder.
 Edgar Allan Poe, poet and writer, may have experienced bipolar disorder.
Benoît Poelvoorde, Belgian comedian and actor.
 Jackson Pollock, American artist.
 Odean Pope, American jazz musician.
 Gail Porter, British TV presenter.
 Amber Portwood, American reality television personality.
 Emil Post, American mathematician and logician. He is best known for his work in the field that eventually became known as computability theory. Post was bipolar and had his first attack in 1921, for the rest of his life he would have to be periodically hospitalized and given electroshock, the standard treatment at that time.
 Genesis Potini, New Zealand chess player. Potini had bipolar disorder and was regularly admitted to hospital.
 Heinz Prechter, entrepreneur, philanthropist, founder of the American Sunroof Company (ASC); former Harvard Business Club Entrepreneur of the Year; after his suicide, his family established the Heinz C. Prechter Bipolar Research Fund at the University of Michigan in his memory.
 Charley Pride, country music artist.
 Aubrey Peeples, American actress and singer.

R 
Gabriele Rabel, botanist, physicist.
Mauro Ranallo, Canadian sport announcer and commentator.
 Lou Reed, musician.
Bebe Rexha, singer, songwriter.
Reckful, American esports player, Twitch streamer and YouTuber
 Jason Ricci, American harmonica player and singer.
 Lynn N. Rivers, member of the United States House of Representatives representing Michigan's 13th congressional district from 1995 to 2003, first openly bipolar member of the United States Congress.
 Rene Rivkin, entrepreneur.
Barret Robbins, former NFL Pro Bowler.
Svend Robinson, Canadian politician, was diagnosed with cyclothymia.
 Theodore Roosevelt, served as the 26th president of the United States from 1901 to 1909
John Ruskin, English art critic of the Victorian era, art patron, draughtsman, watercolourist, prominent social thinker and philanthropist.
Rene Russo, American actress, producer, and former model.

S 
Gary Lee Sampson, American murderer.
Alex Sangha, Canadian social worker and documentary film producer.
Cher Scarlett, American software engineer, workers' rights activist, and corporate whistleblower.
Francesco Scavullo, artist, fashion photographer. In 1981, after four nervous breakdowns Scavullo was diagnosed as manic-depressive.
 Robert Schumann, German composer.
 Katja Schuurman, Dutch television presenter
Reggie Sears, American recording artist, musician, singer, songwriter, composer, producer.
Tommy Lynn Sells, American serial killer.
Anne Sexton, American poet won the Pulitzer Prize for poetry in 1967 for her book Live or Die, diagnosed with bipolar disorder after many suicide attempts.
Paul Sharits, visual artist.
Charlie Sheen, American actor.
 Nina Simone, American singer.
Naomi Sims, American model, businesswoman and author, widely credited as being the first African-American supermodel.
 Frank Sinatra, American singer and actor. "Being an 18-karat manic depressive, and having lived a life of violent emotional contradictions, I have an over-acute capacity for sadness as well as elation."
 Yo Yo Honey Singh, Indian rapper, music producer, singer, and film actor.
 Sushant Singh Rajput, Indian actor
Amy Sky, Canadian songwriter.
 Michael Slater, International Australian cricketer, forced to retire because of related symptoms.
 Tony Slattery, actor and comedian. "I rented a huge warehouse by the river Thames. I just stayed in there on my own, didn't open the mail or answer the phone for months and months and months. I was just in a pool of despair and mania." 
 Harry Smith, American Olympian.
 Tim Smith, rugby league player whose career with NRL side Parramatta Eels was ended due to his bipolar condition, and pressure from the media.
 Charlene Soraia, British singer-songwriter, musician has cyclothymia.
 Britney Spears, American singer, songwriter, and dancer.
 Phil Spector, American record producer.
 Alonzo Spellman, American football player.
 Dusty Springfield, English pop singer.
 Scott Stapp, frontman, Creed.
 Peter Steele, frontman, Type O Negative.
 Brody Stevens, American comedian.
 ND Stevenson, cartoonist and animation producer.
 Ben Stiller, American actor, comedian, and filmmaker.
 David Strickland, actor, Suddenly Susan.
Michael Strunge, Danish poet, killed himself by jumping from a building during mania.
Gilbert Stuart, American painter.
 Poly Styrene (real name Marion Elliot-Said), singer.
 Stuart Sutherland, British psychologist and writer.
 Matthew Sweet, American singer-songwriter.

T 
Corey Taylor, singer and songwriter for Stone Sour and Slipknot (band)
Michael Thalbourne, Australian psychologist and parapsychologist.
 Abbott Handerson Thayer, American artist and painter.
 Debi Thomas, Olympic medalist, former figure skater and physician.
 Steven Thomas, American entrepreneur.
 Ron Thompson, American politician, former member of the West Virginia House of Delegates; has Bipolar II disorder.
 Gene Tierney, actress, nominated for Academy Award for Best Actress (1945).
 Devin Townsend, musician of Strapping Young Lad and The Devin Townsend Band. He took himself off of his medication to write lyrics for Alien.
 Nick Traina, American singer, son of American bestselling writer Danielle Steel.
 Timothy Treadwell, American environmentalist and bear enthusiast, featured in the 2005 documentary film by Werner Herzog titled Grizzly Man.
 Margaret Trudeau, Canadian celebrity and ex-wife of former Canadian Prime Minister Pierre Elliot Trudeau. She now travels Canada and other countries speaking out against the stigmas on mental illness.
 Michael Tunn, Australian radio announcer and television presenter.
 Ted Turner, American media businessman. Founder of CNN.
 Taylor Tomlinson, American comedian

U 
Dimitrius Underwood, former American football player.

V 
 Jean-Claude Van Damme, Belgian actor and martial artist.
 Vincent van Gogh, artist. (among numerous other hypotheses)
 Heleen van Royen, Dutch writer
 Townes Van Zandt, singer-songwriter.
 Joseph Vásquez, American independent filmmaker.
 Eric Victorino, vocalist of The Limousines, author.
 Byron Vincent, writer, performer, and broadcaster.
 Mark Vonnegut, author.

W 
 James Wade, English professional darts player.
 Ayelet Waldman, Israeli-American novelist and essayist, has written about her bipolar II disorder.
Dorothy Wall, Australian author and illustrator best known for creating Blinky Bill
David Walliams, actor, author, comedian and charity fundraiser.
Tom G. Warrior, lead singer and guitarist for heavy metal bands Celtic Frost, Apollyon Sun and Triptykon.
 Ruby Wax, American actress, mental health campaigner, lecturer, and author.
 Scott Weiland, musician for Stone Temple Pilots, Velvet Revolver.
 Pete Wentz, musician for Fall Out Boy.
 Delonte West, American basketball player.
 Kanye West, musician, entrepreneur and fashion designer.
Norman Wexler, screenwriter.
 Mark Whitacre, business executive depicted in the film The Informant.
Norbert Wiener, American mathematician, philosopher, originator of cybernetics.
 Brian Wilson, musician and founding member of The Beach Boys.
 Amy Winehouse, English singer-songwriter.
 Jonathan Winters, American comedian, actor, author, and artist.
 Frank Wisner, OSS officer.
 Will Wood, an American singer-songwriter, composer, filmmaker, and multimedia artist.
Virginia Woolf, writer.

X
 XXXTentacion, rapper, singer, and songwriter.

Y
Lee Thompson Young, actor.
Bert Yancey, American professional golfer.

Z 
 Bruno Zehnder, Swiss photographer.
 Catherine Zeta-Jones, Welsh actress, has Bipolar II disorder.

See also
 List of people with schizophrenia

References

Citations

Bibliography 
 Jamison, Kay Redfield (1993): Touched with Fire: Manic-Depressive Illness and the Artistic Temperament, New York, The Free Press. 

 
Bipolar disorder